An advanced airway includes:

endotracheal tube
supraglottic airway
Laryngeal mask airway
Combitube
King LT

References

Medical equipment
Broad-concept articles